This is a list of the bird species recorded in Madeira. The avifauna of Madeira include a total of 356 species, of which two are endemic, and 9 have been introduced by humans. Two listed species are extinct.

This list's taxonomic treatment (designation and sequence of orders, families and species) and nomenclature (common and scientific names) follow the conventions of The Clements Checklist of Birds of the World, 2022 edition. The family accounts at the beginning of each heading reflect this taxonomy, as do the species counts found in each family account. Introduced and accidental species are included in the total counts for Madeira.

The following tags have been used to highlight several categories. The commonly occurring native species do not fall into any of these categories.

 (A) Accidental - a species that rarely or accidentally occurs in Madeira
 (E) Endemic - a species endemic to Madeira
 (I) Introduced - a species introduced to Madeira as a consequence, direct or indirect, of human actions
 {Extinct} Extinct globally - a species that no longer exists

Ducks, geese, and waterfowl
Order: AnseriformesFamily: Anatidae

Anatidae includes the ducks and most duck-like waterfowl, such as geese and swans. These birds are adapted to an aquatic existence with webbed feet, flattened bills, and feathers that are excellent at shedding water due to an oily coating.

 Graylag goose, Anser anser (A)
 Greater white-fronted goose, Anser albifrons (A)
 Taiga bean-goose, Anser fabalis (A)
 Pink-footed goose, Anser brachyrhynchus (A)
 Brant, Branta bernicla (A)
 Barnacle goose, Branta leucopsis (A)
 Canada goose, Branta canadensis (A)
 Mute swan, Cygnus olor
 Ruddy shelduck, Tadorna ferruginea (A)
 Common shelduck, Tadorna tadorna (A)
 Muscovy duck, Cairina moschata (I)
 Wood duck, Aix sponsa (A)
 Garganey, Spatula querquedula (A)
 Blue-winged teal, Spatula discors (A)
 Northern shoveler, Spatula clypeata (A)
 Gadwall, Mareca strepera (A)
 Eurasian wigeon, Mareca penelope (A)
 American wigeon, Mareca americana
 Mallard, Anas platyrhynchos
 Northern pintail, Anas acuta (A)
 Green-winged teal, Anas crecca 
 Marbled teal, Marmaronetta angustirostris (A) 
 Common pochard, Aythya ferina (A)
 Ring-necked duck, Aythya collaris (A)
 Tufted duck, Aythya fuligula (A)
 Greater scaup, Aythya marila (A)
 Lesser scaup, Aythya affinis (A)
 Surf scoter, Melanitta perspicillata (A)
 Common scoter, Melanitta nigra (A)
 Long-tailed duck, Clangula hyemalis (A)
 Bufflehead, Bucephala albeola (A)
 Common goldeneye, Bucephala clangula (A)
 Red-breasted merganser, Mergus serrator (A)

Pheasants, grouse, and allies

Order: GalliformesFamily: Phasianidae

The Phasianidae are a family of terrestrial birds which consists of quails, partridges, snowcocks, francolins, spurfowls, tragopans, monals, pheasants, peafowls and jungle fowls. In general, they are plump (although they vary in size) and have broad, relatively short wings. 

 Gray partridge, Perdix perdix (A)
 Ring-necked pheasant, Phasianus colchicus (I)
 Indian peafowl, Pavo cristatus (I)
 Common quail, Coturnix coturnix
 Red-legged partridge, Alectoris rufa (I)

Grebes

Order: PodicipediformesFamily: Podicipedidae

Grebes are small to medium-large freshwater diving birds. They have lobed toes and are excellent swimmers and divers. However, they have their feet placed far back on the body, making them quite ungainly on land.

 Little grebe, Tachybaptus ruficollis (A)
 Pied-billed grebe, Podilymbus podiceps (A)
 Horned grebe, Podiceps auritus (A)
 Eared grebe, Podiceps nigricollis (A)

Pigeons and doves

Order: ColumbiformesFamily: Columbidae

Pigeons and doves are stout-bodied birds with short necks and short slender bills with a fleshy cere. The Madeiran wood pigeon (Columba palumbus maderensis), an endemic subspecies, is extinct.

 Rock pigeon, Columba livia
 Stock dove, Columba oenas (A)
 Common wood-pigeon, Columba palumbus (A)
 Trocaz pigeon, Columba trocaz (E) 
 European turtle-dove, Streptopelia turtur
 Eurasian collared-dove, Streptopelia decaocto (I)

Bustards

Order: OtidiformesFamily: Otididae

Bustards are large terrestrial birds mainly associated with dry open country and steppes in the Old World. They are omnivorous and nest on the ground. They walk steadily on strong legs and big toes, pecking for food as they go. They have long broad wings with "fingered" wingtips and striking patterns in flight. Many have interesting mating displays. 

 Little bustard, Tetrax tetrax (A)

Cuckoos

Order: CuculiformesFamily: Cuculidae

The family Cuculidae includes cuckoos, roadrunners and anis. These birds are of variable size with slender bodies, long tails and strong legs. The Old World cuckoos are brood parasites.

 Great spotted cuckoo, Clamator glandarius (A)
 Common cuckoo, Cuculus canorus (A)

Nightjars and allies
Order: CaprimulgiformesFamily: Caprimulgidae

Nightjars are medium-sized nocturnal birds that usually nest on the ground. They have long wings, short legs and very short bills. Most have small feet, of little use for walking, and long pointed wings. Their soft plumage is camouflaged to resemble bark or leaves.

 Common nighthawk, Chordeiles minor (A)
 Red-necked nightjar, Caprimulgus ruficollis (A)
 Eurasian nightjar, Caprimulgus europaeus (A)

Swifts

Order: CaprimulgiformesFamily: Apodidae

Swifts are small birds which spend the majority of their lives flying. These birds have very short legs and never settle voluntarily on the ground, perching instead only on vertical surfaces. Many swifts have long swept-back wings which resemble a crescent or boomerang.

 Chimney swift, Chaetura pelagica (A)
 Alpine swift, Apus melba (A)
 Common swift, Apus apus 
 Plain swift, Apus unicolor
 Pallid swift, Apus pallidus
 Little swift, Apus affinis (A)
 White-rumped swift, Apus caffer (A)

Rails, gallinules, and coots

Order: GruiformesFamily: Rallidae

Rallidae is a large family of small to medium-sized birds which includes the rails, crakes, coots and gallinules. Typically they inhabit dense vegetation in damp environments near lakes, swamps or rivers. In general they are shy and secretive birds, making them difficult to observe. Most species have strong legs and long toes which are well adapted to soft uneven surfaces. They tend to have short, rounded wings and to be weak fliers.

 Water rail, Rallus aquaticus (A)
 Corn crake, Crex crex (A) 
 Sora, Porzana carolina (A)
 Spotted crake, Porzana porzana (A)
 Lesser moorhen, Gallinula angulata (A)
 Eurasian moorhen, Gallinula chloropus
 Eurasian coot, Fulica atra
 American coot, Fulica americana (A)
 Allen's gallinule, Porphyrio alleni (A)
 Purple gallinule, Porphyrio martinicus (A)
 Western swamphen, Porphyrio porphyrio (A)
 Little crake, Zapornia parva (A)
 Baillon's crake, Zapornia pusilla (A)

Cranes

Order: GruiformesFamily: Gruidae

Cranes (Gruidae) are large, long-legged and long-necked birds. Unlike the similar-looking but unrelated herons, cranes fly with necks outstretched, not pulled back. Most have elaborate and noisy courting displays or "dances". 

 Common crane, Grus grus (A)

Thick-knees
Order: CharadriiformesFamily: Burhinidae

The thick-knees (Burhinidae) are a group of largely tropical waders in the family Burhinidae. They are found worldwide within the tropical zone, with some species also breeding in temperate Europe and Australia. They are medium to large waders with strong black or yellow-black bills, large yellow eyes and cryptic plumage. Despite being classed as waders, most species have a preference for arid or semi-arid habitats.

 Eurasian thick-knee, Burhinus oedicnemus (A)

Stilts and avocets
Order: CharadriiformesFamily: Recurvirostridae

Recurvirostridae is a family of large wading birds, which includes the avocets and stilts. The avocets have long legs and long up-curved bills. The stilts have extremely long legs and long, thin, straight bills. 

 Black-winged stilt, Himantopus himantopus (A)
 Pied avocet, Recurvirostra avosetta (A)

Oystercatchers

Order: CharadriiformesFamily: Haematopodidae

The oystercatchers (Haematopodidae) are large and noisy plover-like birds, with strong bills used for smashing or prising open molluscs.

 Eurasian oystercatcher, Haematopus ostralegus (A)
 Canarian oystercatcher, Haematopus meadewaldoi (Extinct)

Plovers and lapwings

Order: CharadriiformesFamily: Charadriidae

The family Charadriidae includes the plovers, dotterels and lapwings. They are small to medium-sized birds with compact bodies, short, thick necks and long, usually pointed, wings. They are found in open country worldwide, mostly in habitats near water. 

 Black-bellied plover, Pluvialis squatarola (A)
 European golden-plover, Pluvialis apricaria (A)
 American golden-plover, Pluvialis dominica (A)
 Pacific golden-plover, Pluvialis fulva (A)
 Northern lapwing, Vanellus vanellus (A)
 Kentish plover, Charadrius alexandrinus
 Common ringed plover, Charadrius hiaticula (A)
 Little ringed plover, Charadrius dubius
 Killdeer, Charadrius vociferus (A)
 Eurasian dotterel, Charadrius morinellus (A)

Sandpipers and allies

Order: CharadriiformesFamily: Scolopacidae

Scolopacidae is a large diverse family of small to medium-sized shorebirds including the sandpipers, curlews, godwits, shanks, tattlers, woodcocks, snipes, dowitchers and phalaropes. The majority of these species eat small invertebrates picked out of the mud or soil. Variation in length of legs and bills enables multiple species to feed in the same habitat, particularly on the coast, without direct competition for food.

 Upland sandpiper, Bartramia longicauda (A)
 Whimbrel, Numenius phaeopus (A)
 Eurasian curlew, Numenius arquata (A)
 Bar-tailed godwit, Limosa lapponica (A)
 Black-tailed godwit, Limosa limosa (A)
 Ruddy turnstone, Arenaria interpres
 Red knot, Calidris canutus 
 Ruff, Calidris pugnax (A)
 Sharp-tailed sandpiper, Calidris acuminata (A)
 Curlew sandpiper, Calidris ferruginea (A)
 Temminck's stint, Calidris temminckii (A)
 Sanderling, Calidris alba 
 Dunlin, Calidris alpina 
 Purple sandpiper, Calidris maritima (A)
 Baird's sandpiper, Calidris bairdii (A)
 Little stint, Calidris minuta (A)
 White-rumped sandpiper, Calidris fuscicollis (A)
 Buff-breasted sandpiper, Calidris subruficollis (A)
 Pectoral sandpiper, Calidris melanotos (A)
 Semipalmated sandpiper, Calidris pusilla (A)
 Western sandpiper, Calidris mauri (A)
 Jack snipe, Lymnocryptes minimus (A)
 Eurasian woodcock, Scolopax rusticola
 Common snipe, Gallinago gallinago 
 Wilson's snipe, Gallinago delicata (A) 
 Wilson's phalarope, Phalaropus tricolor (A)
 Red-necked phalarope, Phalaropus lobatus (A)
 Red phalarope, Phalaropus fulicarius (A)
 Common sandpiper, Actitis hypoleucos
 Spotted sandpiper, Actitis macularius (A)
 Green sandpiper, Tringa ochropus (A)
 Solitary sandpiper, Tringa solitaria (A)
 Spotted redshank, Tringa erythropus (A)
 Greater yellowlegs, Tringa melanoleuca (A)
 Common greenshank, Tringa nebularia (A)
 Lesser yellowlegs, Tringa flavipes (A)
 Marsh sandpiper, Tringa stagnatilis (A)
 Wood sandpiper, Tringa glareola (A)
 Common redshank, Tringa totanus (A)

Pratincoles and coursers

Order: CharadriiformesFamily: Glareolidae

Glareolidae is a family of wading birds comprising the pratincoles, which have short legs, long pointed wings and long forked tails, and the coursers, which have long legs, short wings and long, pointed bills which curve downwards.

 Cream-colored courser, Cursorius cursor (A)
 Collared pratincole, Glareola pratincola (A)

Skuas and jaegers

Order: CharadriiformesFamily: Stercorariidae

The family Stercorariidae are, in general, medium to large sea birds, typically with grey or brown plumage, often with white markings on the wings. They nest on the ground in temperate and arctic regions and are long-distance migrants. 

 Great skua, Stercorarius skua 
 South polar skua, Stercorarius maccormicki (A)
 Pomarine jaeger, Stercorarius pomarinus 
 Parasitic jaeger, Stercorarius parasiticus 
 Long-tailed jaeger, Stercorarius longicaudus

Auks, murres, and puffins
Order: CharadriiformesFamily: Alcidae

Auks (Alcidae) are a family of seabirds which are superficially similar to penguins with their black-and-white colours, their upright posture and some of their habits but which are able to fly. 

 Dovekie, Alle alle (A)
 Atlantic puffin, Fratercula arctica (A)

Gulls, terns, and skimmers
Order: CharadriiformesFamily: Laridae

Laridae is a family of medium to large seabirds and includes gulls, terns, and skimmers. Gulls are typically grey or white, often with black markings on the head or wings. They have stout, longish bills and webbed feet. Terns are a group of generally medium to large seabirds typically with grey or white plumage, often with black markings on the head. Most terns hunt fish by diving but some pick insects off the surface of fresh water. Terns are generally long-lived birds, with several species known to live in excess of 30 years.

 Black-legged kittiwake, Rissa tridactyla (A)
 Sabine's gull, Xema sabini (A)
 Slender-billed gull, Chroicocephalus genei (A)
 Bonaparte's gull, Chroicocephalus philadelphia (A)
 Black-headed gull, Chroicocephalus ridibundus
 Little gull, Hydrocoloeus minutus (A)
 Laughing gull, Leucophaeus atricilla (A)
 Franklin's gull, Leucophaeus pipixcan (A)
 Mediterranean gull, Ichthyaetus melanocephalus 
 Pallas's gull, Ichthyaetus ichthyaetus (A)
 Common gull, Larus canus (A)
 Short-billed gull, Larus brachyrhynchus (A)
 Ring-billed gull, Larus delawarensis (A)
 Herring gull, Larus argentatus (A)
 Yellow-legged gull, Larus michahellis
 Iceland gull, Larus glaucoides (A)
 Lesser black-backed gull, Larus fuscus
 Glaucous gull, Larus hyperboreus (A)
 Great black-backed gull, Larus marinus (A)
 Sooty tern, Onychoprion fuscatus (A)
 Little tern, Sternula albifrons (A)
 Gull-billed tern, Gelochelidon nilotica (A)
 Caspian tern, Hydroprogne caspia (A)
 Black tern, Chlidonias niger (A)
 White-winged tern, Chlidonias leucopterus (A)
 Whiskered tern, Chlidonias hybrida (A)
 Roseate tern, Sterna dougallii
 Common tern, Sterna hirundo
 Arctic tern, Sterna paradisaea 
 Sandwich tern, Thalasseus sandvicensis (A)

Tropicbirds

Order: PhaethontiformesFamily: Phaethontidae

Tropicbirds are slender white birds of tropical oceans, with exceptionally long central tail feathers. Their heads and long wings have black markings. 

 Red-billed tropicbird, Phaethon aethereus (A)

Loons

Order: GalliformesFamily: Gaviidae

The loons or divers are a group of aquatic birds found in many parts of North America and northern Eurasia (Europe, Asia and debatably Africa). All living species of loons are members of the genus (Gavia), family (Gaviidae) and order (Gaviiformes). 

 Common loon, Gavia immer

Southern storm-petrels

Order: ProcellariiformesFamily: Oceanitidae

The southern storm-petrels are relatives of the petrels and are the smallest seabirds. They feed on planktonic crustaceans and small fish picked from the surface, typically while hovering. The flight is fluttering and sometimes bat-like.

 Wilson's storm-petrel, Oceanites oceanicus
 White-faced storm-petrel, Pelagodroma marina
 Black-bellied storm-petrel, Fregetta tropica (A)

Northern storm-petrels
Order: ProcellariiformesFamily: Hydrobatidae

Though the members of this family are similar in many respects to the southern storm-petrels, including their general appearance and habits, there are enough genetic differences to warrant their placement in a separate family.

 European storm-petrel, Hydrobates pelagicus
 Leach's storm-petrel, Hydrobates leucorhous (A)
 Swinhoe's storm-petrel, Hydrobates monorhis (A)
 Band-rumped storm-petrel, Hydrobates castro

Shearwaters and petrels

Order: ProcellariiformesFamily: Procellariidae

The procellariids are the main group of medium-sized "true petrels", characterised by united nostrils with medium septum and a long outer functional primary.

 Northern fulmar, Fulmarus glacialis (A)
 Zino's petrel, Pterodroma madeira 
 Fea's petrel, Pterodroma feae 
 Black-capped petrel, Pterodroma hasitata (A)
 Bulwer's petrel, Bulweria bulwerii
 Cory's shearwater, Calonectris diomedea
 Cape Verde shearwater, Calonectris edwardsii (A) 
 Great shearwater, Ardenna gravis 
 Sooty shearwater, Ardenna griseus (A) 
 Manx shearwater, Puffinus puffinus
 Balearic shearwater, Puffinus mauretanicus (A) 
 Barolo shearwater, Puffinus baroli

Storks

Order: CiconiiformesFamily: Ciconiidae

Storks are large, long-legged, long-necked, wading birds with long, stout bills. Storks are mute, but bill-clattering is an important mode of communication at the nest. Their nests can be large and may be reused for many years. Many species are migratory. 

 Black stork, Ciconia nigra (A)
 White stork, Ciconia ciconia (A)

Boobies and gannets

Order: SuliformesFamily: Sulidae

The sulids comprise the gannets and boobies. Both groups are medium to large coastal seabirds that plunge-dive for fish. 

 Brown booby, Sula leucogaster (A)
 Northern gannet, Morus bassanus (A)

Cormorants and shags
Order: SuliformesFamily: Phalacrocoracidae

Phalacrocoracidae is a family of medium to large coastal, fish-eating seabirds that includes cormorants and shags. Plumage colouration varies, with the majority having mainly dark plumage, some species being black-and-white and a few being colourful.

 Great cormorant, Phalacrocorax carbo (A)
 European shag, Gulosus aristotelis (A)

Herons, egrets, and bitterns

Order: PelecaniformesFamily: Ardeidae

The family Ardeidae contains the bitterns, herons and egrets. Herons and egrets are medium to large wading birds with long necks and legs. Bitterns tend to be shorter necked and more wary. Members of Ardeidae fly with their necks retracted, unlike other long-necked birds such as storks, ibises and spoonbills.

 Great bittern, Botaurus stellaris (A)
 Little bittern, Ixobrychus minutus (A)
 Gray heron, Ardea cinerea
 Purple heron, Ardea purpurea (A)
 Great egret, Egretta alba
 Little egret, Egretta garzetta
 Western reef-heron, Egretta gularis (A)
 Cattle egret, Bubulcus ibis (A)
 Squacco heron, Ardeola ralloides (A)
 Green heron, Butorides virescens (A)
 Black-crowned night-heron, Nycticorax nycticorax (A)
 Yellow-crowned night-heron, Nyctanassa violacea (A)

Ibises and spoonbills

Order: PelecaniformesFamily: Threskiornithidae

Threskiornithidae is a family of large terrestrial and wading birds which includes the ibises and spoonbills. They have long, broad wings with 11 primary and about 20 secondary feathers. They are strong fliers and despite their size and weight, very capable soarers.

 Glossy ibis, Plegadis falcinellus (A)
 Eurasian spoonbill, Platalea leucorodia (A)

Osprey
Order: AccipitriformesFamily: Pandionidae

The family Pandionidae contains only one species, the osprey. The osprey is a medium-large raptor and a specialist fish-eater with a worldwide distribution.

 Osprey, Pandion haliaetus (A)

Hawks, kites and eagles

Order: AccipitriformesFamily: Accipitridae

Accipitridae is a family of birds of prey, which includes hawks, eagles, kites, harriers and Old World vultures. These birds have powerful hooked beaks for tearing flesh from their prey, strong legs, powerful talons and keen eyesight.

 Black-winged kite, Elanus caeruleus (A)
 Egyptian vulture, Neophron percnopterus (A)
 European honey-buzzard, Pernis apivorus (A)
 Short-toed snake-eagle, Circaetus gallicus (A)
 Booted eagle, Hieraaetus pennatus (A)
 Tawny eagle, Aquila rapax (A)
 Steppe eagle, Aquila nipalensis (A)
 Eurasian marsh-harrier, Circus aeruginosus (A)
 Hen harrier, Circus cyaneus (A)
 Pallid harrier, Circus macrourus (A)
 Montagu's harrier, Circus pygargus (A)
 Eurasian sparrowhawk, Accipiter nisus
 Red kite, Milvus milvus (A) 
 Black kite, Milvus migrans (A) 
 Common buzzard, Buteo buteo
 Long-legged buzzard, Buteo rufinus (A)

Barn-owls
Order: StrigiformesFamily: Tytonidae

Barn-owls are medium-sized to large owls with large heads and characteristic heart-shaped faces. They have long strong legs with powerful talons. 

 Barn owl, Tyto alba

Owls

Order: StrigiformesFamily: Strigidae

Typical owls are small to large solitary nocturnal birds of prey. They have large forward-facing eyes and ears, a hawk-like beak and a conspicuous circle of feathers around each eye called a facial disc. 

 Eurasian scops-owl, Otus scops (A)
 Long-eared owl, Asio otus (A)
 Short-eared owl, Asio flammeus (A)

Hoopoes
Order: CoraciiformesFamily: Upupidae

Hoopoes have black, white and orangey-pink colouring with a large erectile crest on their head. .

 Eurasian hoopoe, Upupa epops

Kingfishers
Order: CoraciiformesFamily: Alcedinidae

Kingfishers are medium-sized birds with large heads, long, pointed bills, short legs and stubby tails.

 Common kingfisher, Alcedo atthis (A)

Bee-eaters
Order: CoraciiformesFamily: Meropidae

The bee-eaters are a group of near passerine birds in the family Meropidae. Most species are found in Africa but others occur in southern Europe, Madagascar, Australia and New Guinea. They are characterised by richly coloured plumage, slender bodies and usually elongated central tail feathers. All are colourful and have long downturned bills and pointed wings, which give them a swallow-like appearance when seen from afar. 

 Blue-cheeked bee-eater, Merops persicus (A)
 European bee-eater, Merops apiaster (A)

Rollers
Order: CoraciiformesFamily: Coraciidae

Rollers resemble crows in size and build, but are more closely related to the kingfishers and bee-eaters. They share the colourful appearance of those groups with blues and browns predominating. The two inner front toes are connected, but the outer toe is not.

 European roller, Coracias garrulus (A)

Woodpeckers
Order: PiciformesFamily: Picidae

Woodpeckers are small to medium-sized birds with chisel-like beaks, short legs, stiff tails and long tongues used for capturing insects. Some species have feet with two toes pointing forward and two backward, while several species have only three toes. Many woodpeckers have the habit of tapping noisily on tree trunks with their beaks.

 Eurasian wryneck, Jynx torquilla (A)

Falcons and caracaras

Order: FalconiformesFamily: Falconidae

Falconidae is a family of diurnal birds of prey. They differ from hawks, eagles and kites in that they kill with their beaks instead of their talons. 

 Lesser kestrel, Falco naumanni (A) 
 Eurasian kestrel, Falco tinnunculus
 Red-footed falcon, Falco vespertinus (A) 
 Eleonora's falcon, Falco eleonorae (A)
 Merlin, Falco columbarius (A)
 Eurasian hobby, Falco subbuteo (A)
 Peregrine falcon, Falco peregrinus (A)

Old World parrots
Order: PsittaciformesFamily: Psittaculidae

Characteristic features of parrots include a strong curved bill, an upright stance, strong legs, and clawed zygodactyl feet. Many parrots are vividly colored, and some are multi-colored. Old World parrots are found from Africa east across south and southeast Asia and Oceania to Australia and New Zealand.

Rose-ringed parakeet, Psittacula krameri (I)

Old-World orioles

Order: PasseriformesFamily: Oriolidae

The Old World orioles are colourful medium-sized passerine birds. The beak is slightly curved and hooked, and, except in the figbirds, as long as the head. The plumage of most species is bright and showy, although the females often have duller plumage than the males. They are not related to the New World orioles. 

 Eurasian golden oriole, Oriolus oriolus (A)

Shrikes

Order: PasseriformesFamily: Laniidae

Shrikes are passerine birds known for their habit of catching other birds and small animals and impaling the uneaten portions of their bodies on thorns. A typical shrike's beak is hooked, like a bird of prey.

 Red-backed shrike, Lanius collurio (A)
 Woodchat shrike, Lanius senator (A)

Crows, jays, and magpies

Order: PasseriformesFamily: Corvidae

The family Corvidae includes crows, ravens, jays, choughs, magpies, treepies, nutcrackers and ground jays. Corvids are above average in size among the Passeriformes, and some of the larger species show high levels of intelligence. 

 Eurasian jackdaw, Corvus monedula (A)
 Rook, Corvus frugilegus (A)
 Hooded crow, Corvus cornix (A)
 Common raven, Corvus corax (A)

Larks

Order: PasseriformesFamily: Alaudidae

Larks are small terrestrial birds with often extravagant songs and display flights. Most larks are fairly dull in appearance. Their food is insects and seeds. 

 Greater short-toed lark, Calandrella brachydactyla (A)
 Calandra lark, Melanocorypha calandra (A)
 Mediterranean short-toed lark, Alaudala rufescens
 Wood lark, Lullula arborea (A) 
 Eurasian skylark, Alauda arvensis (A)

Reed warblers and allies

Order: PasseriformesFamily: Acrocephalidae

Acrocephalidae (the marsh- and tree-warblers or acrocephalid warblers) is a family of oscine passerine birds, in the superfamily Sylvioidea. Most species are rather plain olivaceous brown above with much yellow to beige below. They are usually found in open woodland, reedbeds or tall grass.

 Melodious warbler, Hippolais polyglotta (A)
 Icterine warbler, Hippolais icterina (A)
 Sedge warbler, Acrocephalus schoenobaenus (A)
 Marsh warbler, Acrocephalus palustris (A)
 Common reed warbler, Acrocephalus scirpaceus 
 Great reed warbler, Acrocephalus arundinaceus (A)

Grassbirds and allies

Order: PasseriformesFamily: Locustellidae

Locustellidae is a family of small insectivorous songbirds ("warblers"), formerly placed in the Old World warbler family. It contains the grass-warblers, grassbirds, and the Bradypterus "bush-warblers". The species are smallish birds with tails that are usually long and pointed. Most live in scrubland and frequently hunt food by clambering through thick tangled growth or pursuing it on the ground. 

 River warbler, Locustella fluviatilis (A)
 Common grasshopper-warbler, Locustella naevia (A)

Swallows
Order: PasseriformesFamily: Hirundinidae

The family Hirundinidae is adapted to aerial feeding. They have a slender streamlined body, long pointed wings and a short bill with a wide gape. The feet are adapted to perching rather than walking, and the front toes are partially joined at the base. 

 Bank swallow, Riparia riparia (A)
 Eurasian crag-martin, Ptyonoprogne rupestris (A)
 Barn swallow, Hirundo rustica 
 Red-rumped swallow, Cecropis daurica (A)
 Common house-martin, Delichon urbicum

Leaf warblers

Order: PasseriformesFamily: Phylloscopidae

Phylloscopidae is a family of small insectivorous birds formerly placed in the Old World warbler family. Its members occur in Eurasia, ranging into Wallacea and Africa (and the Arctic warbler breeding east into Alaska). Most live in forest and scrub and frequently catch food on the wing.

 Wood warbler, Phylloscopus sibilatrix (A)
 Western Bonelli's warbler, Phylloscopus bonelli (A)
 Yellow-browed warbler, Phylloscopus inornatus (A)
 Willow warbler, Phylloscopus trochilus (A)
 Common chiffchaff, Phylloscopus collybita (A)
 Iberian chiffchaff, Phylloscopus ibericus (A)
 Greenish warbler, Phylloscopus trochiloides (A)
 Two-barred warbler, Phylloscopus plumbeitarsus (A)

Sylviid warblers, parrotbills, and allies

Order: PasseriformesFamily: Sylviidae

The family Sylviidae is a group of small insectivorous passerine birds. They mainly occur as breeding species, as the common name implies, in Europe, Asia and, to a lesser extent, Africa. Most are of generally undistinguished appearance, but many have distinctive songs.

 Eurasian blackcap, Sylvia atricapilla
 Garden warbler, Sylvia borin (A)
 Lesser whitethroat, Curruca curruca (A)
 Western Orphean warbler, Curruca hortensis (A)
 Sardinian warbler, Curruca melanocephala (A)
 Western subalpine warbler, Curruca iberiae 
 Greater whitethroat, Curruca communis (A)
 Spectacled warbler, Curruca conspicillata

Kinglets

Order: PasseriformesFamily: Regulidae

The kinglets, also called crests, are a small group of birds often included in the Old World warblers, but frequently given family status because they also resemble the titmice.

 Goldcrest, Regulus regulus
 Madeira firecrest, Regulus madeirensis (E)

Wrens
Order: PasseriformesFamily: Troglodytidae

The wrens are mainly small and inconspicuous except for their loud songs. These birds have short wings and thin down-turned bills. Several species often hold their tails upright. All are insectivorous.

 Eurasian wren, Troglodytes troglodytes (A)

Starlings

Order: PasseriformesFamily: Sturnidae

Starlings are small to medium-sized passerine birds. Their flight is strong and direct and they are very gregarious. Their preferred habitat is fairly open country. They eat insects and fruit. Plumage is typically dark with a metallic sheen.

 European starling, Sturnus vulgaris
 Spotless starling, Sturnus unicolor (A)
 Rosy starling, Pastor roseus (A)
 Common myna, Acridotheres tristis (A)
 Greater blue-eared starling, Lamprotornis chalybaeus (A)

Thrushes and allies

Order: PasseriformesFamily: Turdidae

The thrushes are a group of passerine birds that occur mainly in the Old World. They are plump, soft plumaged, small to medium-sized insectivores or sometimes omnivores, often feeding on the ground. Many have attractive songs. 

 Wood thrush, Hylocichla mustelina (A)
 Mistle thrush, Turdus viscivorus (A)
 Song thrush, Turdus philomelos (A)
 Redwing, Turdus iliacus (A)
 Eurasian blackbird, Turdus merula
 Fieldfare, Turdus pilaris (A)
 Ring ouzel, Turdus torquatus (A)
 Black-throated thrush, Turdus atrogularis (A)
 Red-throated thrush, Turdus ruficollis (A)

Old World flycatchers

Order: PasseriformesFamily: Muscicapidae

Old World flycatchers are a large group of small passerine birds native to the Old World. They are mainly small arboreal insectivores. The appearance of these birds is highly varied, but they mostly have weak songs and harsh calls.

 Spotted flycatcher, Muscicapa striata (A)
 Rufous-tailed scrub-robin, Cercotrichas galactotes (A)
 European robin, Erithacus rubecula
 Common nightingale, Luscinia megarhynchos (A)
 Bluethroat, Luscinia svecica (A)
 Red-breasted flycatcher, Ficedula parva (A)
 European pied flycatcher, Ficedula hypoleuca (A)
 Common redstart, Phoenicurus phoenicurus (A)
 Black redstart, Phoenicurus ochruros (A)
 Rufous-tailed rock-thrush, Monticola saxatilis (A)
 Whinchat, Saxicola rubetra (A)
 European stonechat, Saxicola rubicola (A)
 Northern wheatear, Oenanthe oenanthe (A)
 Isabelline wheatear, Oenanthe isabellina (A)
 Desert wheatear, Oenanthe deserti (A)
 Western black-eared wheatear, Oenanthe hispanica (A)

Waxbills and allies

Order: PasseriformesFamily: Estrildidae

The estrildid finches are small passerine birds of the Old World tropics and Australasia. They are gregarious and often colonial seed eaters with short thick but pointed bills. They are all similar in structure and habits, but have wide variation in plumage colours and patterns. 

 Common waxbill, Estrilda astrild (I)
 Red avadavat, Amandava amandava (I)

Accentors
Order: PasseriformesFamily: Prunellidae

The accentors are in the only bird family, Prunellidae, which is completely endemic to the Palearctic. They are small, fairly drab species superficially similar to sparrows.

 Dunnock, Prunella modularis (A)

Old World sparrows
Order: PasseriformesFamily: Passeridae

Old World sparrows are small passerine birds. In general, sparrows tend to be small, plump, brown or grey birds with short tails and short powerful beaks. Sparrows are seed eaters, but they also consume small insects. 

 House sparrow, Passer domesticus (A)
 Spanish sparrow, Passer hispaniolensis (I)
 Rock sparrow, Petronia petronia

Wagtails and pipits
Order: PasseriformesFamily: Motacillidae

Motacillidae is a family of small passerine birds with medium to long tails. They include the wagtails, longclaws and pipits. They are slender, ground feeding insectivores of open country.

 Gray wagtail, Motacilla cinerea
 Western yellow wagtail, Motacilla flava (A)
 Citrine wagtail, Motacilla citreola (A) 
 White wagtail, Motacilla alba
 Richard's pipit, Anthus richardi (A)
 Tawny pipit, Anthus campestris (A)
 Berthelot's pipit, Anthus berthelotii
 Meadow pipit, Anthus pratensis (A)
 Tree pipit, Anthus trivialis (A)
 Red-throated pipit, Anthus cervinus (A)
 Rock pipit, Anthus petrosus (A)

Finches, euphonias, and allies
Order: PasseriformesFamily: Fringillidae

Finches are seed-eating passerine birds, that are small to moderately large and have a strong beak, usually conical and in some species very large. All have twelve tail feathers and nine primaries. These birds have a bouncing flight with alternating bouts of flapping and gliding on closed wings, and most sing well. 

 Common chaffinch, Fringilla coelebs
 Brambling, Fringilla montifringilla (A)
 Hawfinch, Coccothraustes coccothraustes (A)
 Trumpeter finch, Bucanetes githagineus (A)
 European greenfinch, Chloris chloris
 Eurasian linnet, Linaria cannabina
 Common redpoll, Acanthis flammea (A)
 Parrot crossbill, Loxia pytyopsittacus (A)
 Red crossbill, Loxia curvirostra (A)
 European goldfinch, Carduelis carduelis
 European serin, Serinus serinus (A)
 Island canary, Serinus canaria
 Eurasian siskin, Spinus spinus

Longspurs and snow buntings
Order: PasseriformesFamily: Calcariidae

The Calcariidae are a small family of passerine birds. 

 Snow bunting, Plectrophenax nivalis (A)

Old World buntings
Order: PasseriformesFamily: Emberizidae

The emberizids are a family of passerine birds. They are seed-eating birds with distinctively shaped bills.

 Corn bunting, Emberiza calandra (A)
 Ortolan bunting, Emberiza hortulana (A)
 Reed bunting, Emberiza schoeniclus (A)
 Little bunting, Emberiza pusilla (A)

New World warblers
Order: PasseriformesFamily: Parulidae

A group of small, often colourful passerine birds restricted to the New World. Most are arboreal and insectivorous. 

 American redstart, Setophaga ruticilla (A)
 Yellow warbler, Setophaga petechia (A)

See also
 List of birds of Portugal
List of birds
Lists of birds by region

References

Avibase - Bird Checklists of the World: Madeira.

External links

Avibase - Bird Checklists of the World: Madeira.

birds
Madeira
'
Madeira
Madeira